John William Garrick (22 July 1926 – 6 January 2019) was an Australian rules footballer who played with South Melbourne in the Victorian Football League (VFL).

Notes

External links 

Australian rules footballers from Victoria (Australia)
Sydney Swans players
Yarraville Football Club players
1926 births
2019 deaths